Lucena is the capital city of the province of Quezon, Philippines. Lucena may also refer to:

Places

Brazil
Lucena, Paraíba, a municipality in the state of Paraíba in the Northeast Region
Porto Lucena, a municipality in the state of Rio Grande do Sul
Presidente Lucena, a municipality in the state of Rio Grande do Sul

Philippines
New Lucena, a fourth class municipality in the province of Iloilo

Spain
Lucena, Córdoba, a municipality in the province of Córdoba, in the autonomous community of Andalusia
Lucena de Jalón, a municipality located in the province of Zaragoza, in the autonomous community of Aragon
Lucena del Cid, a municipality in the comarca of Alcalatén, province of Castellon, in the autonomous community of Valencian Community
Lucena del Puerto, a municipality located in the province of Huelva, in the autonomous community of Andalusia

People
Lucena (surname), including a list of persons with the surname

Others
Luis Ramírez de Lucena (1460s–1530s), 15th century chess player
Lucena position, a chess position incorrectly named after Luis Ramírez de Lucena
Lucena, a genus of moths in the family Sphingidae described by Rambur in 1840, but now considered to be a synonym of Mimas
Lucena CF, a Spanish football team based in Lucena, in the province of Córdoba, in the autonomous community of Andalusia